Murton is a surname. Notable people with the surname include:

John Murton (theologian) (1585–c.1626), co-founder of the Baptist faith in Great Britain
John Murton (footballer) (born 1943), Australian rules footballer
Lionel Murton (1915–2006), English-Canadian character actor
Matt Murton (born 1981), American baseball player
Oscar Murton (1914–2009), British politician
Peter Murton (1924–2009), British film art director and production designer
Phillip Murton (born 1973), Australian rules footballer
Tom Murton (1928–1990), American penologist
Walter Murton (born 1892), British art director known for his film set designs